Pirate Party of Montenegro is a Montenegrin political party. It was founded as a non-governmental organisation in November 2011, and registered as a political party on 11 June 2012.

Party representative Vladimir Urdešić announced the creation of the party following the ratification of Anti-Counterfeiting Trade Agreement, seen as a "major blow to human rights and freedoms".

References

External links 
 Official Website
 
 

Montenegro
Political parties in Montenegro
2012 establishments in Montenegro
Political parties established in 2012